The Yarra Valley is the region surrounding the Yarra River in Victoria, Australia. The name Yarra Valley is used in reference to the upper regions surrounding the Yarra River and generally does not encompass the lower regions including the city and suburban areas, where the topography flattens out, or the upper reaches which are in inaccessible bushland. Included in the Yarra Valley is the sub-region of the Upper Yarra Valley which encompasses the towns of the former Shire of Upper Yarra in the catchment area upstream of and including Woori Yallock. The Yarra Valley is a popular day-trip and tourist area, featuring a range of natural features and agricultural produce, as well as the Lilydale to Warburton Rail Trail.

The Yarra Valley is host to a thriving wine growing industry. The area's relatively cool climate makes it particularly suited to the production of high-quality chardonnay, pinot noir and sparkling wine.

Yarra Valley towns fall under the Nillumbik and Yarra Ranges Shire Councils. Major towns include Coldstream, Yarra Glen, Healesville and Warburton.

It is also the filming location for the first two seasons of The Saddle Club.

See also
Yarra Valley (wine)
Australian wine
Shire of Upper Yarra
Shire of Healesville

Literature 
 Brian Finlayson: The Physical Geography of the Yarra Valleymore, in: Yarra River Conference, 13–16 April 1991, pp. 1–10 (Online)

References

External links

 
Regions of Victoria (Australia)
Wine regions of Victoria (Australia)
Yarra River